Robert Talkan (fl. 1399–1407), of York, was an English Member of Parliament.

He was a Member (MP) of the Parliament of England for City of York in 1402 and 1407. He was Mayor of York 1399–1400.

References

14th-century births
15th-century deaths
15th-century English people
14th-century English people
Lord Mayors of York
People from York
Members of the Parliament of England (pre-1707)